William Beeche (fl. 1386) was an English Member of Parliament.

He was a Member (MP) of the Parliament of England for Southwark in 1386.

References

14th-century English people
People from Lewes
Members of the Parliament of England (pre-1707)